Madhavan Ayyappath (24 April 1934 – 25 December 2021) was an Indian poet and translator from the south state of Kerala. He was a recipient of the Kerala Sahitya Akademi Award.

Biography
Madhavan Ayyappath was born in 1934 in Chowannur, near Kunnamkulam, in Thrissur district, son of Ayyappath Lakshmikkutty Amma and Peringode Karumathil Ramunni Nair.

He obtained a BA degree in Economics from Madras University and did his Master's degree in English literature. He was a civil servant, and worked for the Government of India until 1992.

Madhavan was married to T. C. Ramadevi, and was the father of Sanjay and Manjima. He died on 25 December 2021, Christmas Day, at the age of 87 after collapsing in an apartment in Kuttappuram.

Works
 Jivacharitra Kurippukal
 Kilimozhikal
 Sri Narayana Guru (English)
 Dharmapatham (Translation)

Awards
 1988: Kerala Sahitya Akademi Award for Kilimozhikal
 2003: Aasan Prize

References

1934 births
2021 deaths
Writers from Thrissur
Poets from Kerala
Malayalam-language writers
Malayalam poets
Recipients of the Kerala Sahitya Akademi Award
University of Madras alumni
Indian male poets
20th-century Indian poets
20th-century Indian translators
20th-century Indian male writers